Broughton Beach may refer to:

 Broughton Bay in Wales, U.K.
 Broughton Beach, a riverfront park in northeast Portland, Oregon, U.S.  See List of parks in Portland, Oregon#Northeast Portland